Dilts is a surname. Notable people with the surname include:

Bucky Dilts (born 1953), American football player
Kimberly Dilts, American actress and filmmaker
Stephen Dilts, Commissioner of the New Jersey Department of Transportation